Importin-4 is a protein that in humans is encoded by the IPO4 gene.

References

Further reading